The 2018 Copa Libertadores qualifying stages were played from 22 January to 22 February 2018. A total of 19 teams competed in the qualifying stages to decide four of the 32 places in the group stage of the 2018 Copa Libertadores.

Draw

The draw for the qualifying stages and group stage was held on 20 December 2017, 20:00 PYST (UTC−3), at the CONMEBOL Convention Centre in Luque, Paraguay.

Teams were seeded by their CONMEBOL ranking of the Copa Libertadores (shown in parentheses), taking into account of the following three factors:
Performance in the last 10 years, taking into account Copa Libertadores results in the period 2008–2017
Historical coefficient, taking into account Copa Libertadores results in the period 1960–2007
Local tournament champion, with bonus points awarded to domestic league champions of the last 10 years

For the first stage, the six teams were drawn into three ties (E1–E3), with the seeded teams hosting the second leg.

For the second stage, the 16 teams were drawn into eight ties (C1–C8), with the seeded teams hosting the second leg. Teams from the same association could not be drawn into the same tie, excluding the winners of the first stage, which were unseeded and whose identity was not known at the time of the draw, and could be drawn into the same tie with another team from the same association.

Notes

For the third stage, no draw was made, and the eight teams were allocated into the following four ties (G1–G4), with the second stage winners with the higher CONMEBOL ranking hosting the second leg. As the identity of the winners of the second stage was not known at the time of the draw, they could be drawn into the same tie with another team from the same association.
Second stage winner C1 vs. Second stage winner C8
Second stage winner C2 vs. Second stage winner C7
Second stage winner C3 vs. Second stage winner C6
Second stage winner C4 vs. Second stage winner C5

Format

In the qualifying stages, each tie was played on a home-and-away two-legged basis. If tied on aggregate, the away goals rule was used. If still tied, extra time was not played, and a penalty shoot-out was used to determine the winner (Regulations Article 29).

Bracket

The qualifying stages were structured as follows:
First stage (6 teams): The three winners of the first stage advanced to the second stage to join the 13 teams which were given byes to the second stage.
Second stage (16 teams): The eight winners of the second stage advanced to the third stage.
Third stage (8 teams): The four winners of the third stage advanced to the group stage to join the 28 direct entrants. The two best teams eliminated in the third stage entered the Copa Sudamericana second stage.
The bracket was decided based on the first stage draw and second stage draw, which were held on 20 December 2017.

Winner G1

Winner G2

Winner G3

Winner G4

First stage
The first legs were played on 22 January, and the second legs were played on 26 January 2018.

|}

Match E1

Olimpia won 2–0 on aggregate and advanced to the second stage (Match C5).

Match E2

Tied 1–1 on aggregate, Deportivo Táchira won on away goals and advanced to the second stage (Match C1).

Match E3

Tied 3–3 on aggregate, Oriente Petrolero won on away goals and advanced to the second stage (Match C3).

Second stage
The first legs were played on 30–31 January and 1 February, and the second legs were played on 6–8 February 2018.

|}

Match C1

Santa Fe won 3–2 on aggregate and advanced to the third stage (Match G1).

Match C2

Nacional won 2–0 on aggregate and advanced to the third stage (Match G2).

Match C3

Jorge Wilstermann won 4–3 on aggregate and advanced to the third stage (Match G3).

Match C4

Guaraní won 6–1 on aggregate and advanced to the third stage (Match G4).

Match C5

Junior won 3–2 on aggregate and advanced to the third stage (Match G4).

Match C6

Vasco da Gama won 6–0 on aggregate and advanced to the third stage (Match G3).

Match C7

Tied 3–3 on aggregate, Banfield won on away goals and advanced to the third stage (Match G2).

Match C8

Santiago Wanderers won 2–1 on aggregate and advanced to the third stage (Match G1).

Third stage
The first legs were played on 13–15 February, and the second legs were played on 20–22 February 2018.

|}

Match G1

Santa Fe won 5–1 on aggregate and advanced to the group stage (Group D).

Match G2

Nacional won 3–2 on aggregate and advanced to the group stage (Group F).

Match G3

Tied 4–4 on aggregate, Vasco da Gama won on penalties and advanced to the group stage (Group E).

Match G4

Junior won 1–0 on aggregate and advanced to the group stage (Group H).

Copa Sudamericana qualification

The two best teams eliminated in the third stage entered the Copa Sudamericana second stage. Only matches in the third stage were considered for the ranking of teams.

Notes

References

External links
CONMEBOL Libertadores 2018, CONMEBOL.com

1
January 2018 sports events in South America
February 2018 sports events in South America